National Radical Organization was a Polish collaborationist pro-Nazi organization, founded following the 1939 German invasion of Poland by Andrzej Świetlicki and Stanisław Trzeciak.

In March 1940, NOR co-organized with Germany a series of assaults on houses and shops of Warsaw Jews, known as the Easter pogrom. During the incidents, NOR representatives appealed to the Polish society for participation in pogroms, joining the organization and collaboration with the Nazis against the Soviet Union. The organization even justified the defeat in the September campaign as a fault of the Sanation and accepted the loss of Western lands. "Attack" was the paramilitary wing of the party, operating especially during the Easter pogrom. They were responsible for marking Aryan stores with the symbol of the Top Cross.

The National Radical Organization received from the German military authorities the former premises of the Young Poland Union in Aleja Ujazdowskie in Warsaw, Andrzej Świetlicki was assigned the former apartment of Julian Tuwim.

NRO was initially supported by the German military administration and military intelligence (Abwehr and Gestapo).

After the takeover of power by the civil administration of the General Government and after the ban on cooperation with political organizations in Poland issued by Hitler in April 1940, the NOR was deprived of protection and cooperation from the Nazis. In May 1940, Świetlicki was arrested and imprisoned in Pawiak. On June 20, 1940, he was shot in Palmiry. NOR was dissolved in June 1940.

Members of the NRO 
Andrzej Świetlicki (1915–1940)
Stanisław Trzeciak (1873–1944)
Władysław Studnicki (1867–1953)
Stanisław Brochwicz (1910–1941)

References

National radicalism
Polish collaborators with Nazi Germany
Political parties established in 1939
Political parties disestablished in 1940
1939 establishments in Poland
1939 disestablishments in Poland